This is a list of awards and nominations received by Indian poet, lyricist and film director Gulzar.

Gulzar was awarded the Padma Bhushan in 2004 for his contribution to the arts and the Sahitya Akademi Award in 2002. He has won 6 National Film Awards and 22 Filmfare Awards. At the 81st Academy Awards, he won the Academy Award for Best Original Song for "Jai Ho" (shared with A.R.Rahman), for the film Slumdog Millionaire. On 31 January 2010, the same song won him a Grammy Award in the category of Grammy Award for Best Song Written for a Motion Picture, Television or Other Visual Media.  Gulzar has won the most Filmfare Awards for Best Lyricist (13 in total) as well as four Filmfare Awards for Best Dialogue. He was also awarded the 2012 Indira Gandhi Award for National Integration.

Gulzar received the 2013 Dadasaheb Phalke Award, the highest award of the Indian cinema, on 3 May 2014 at the 61st National Film Awards.

Academy Awards

IIFA Awards

Filmfare Awards

Grammy Awards

National Film Awards

Mirchi Music Awards

Screen Awards

Zee Cine Awards

Honours
 2002 — Sahitya Akademi Award for "Dhuan".
 2004 – Padma Bhushan – India's third highest civilian honour from the Government of India.
 2004 — Sahir Award presented by Adeeb International (Sahir Cultural Academy).
 2004 – Bengal Film Journalists' Association – Satyajit Ray Lifetime Achievement Award.
 2012 – Indira Gandhi Award for National Integration.

See also

References

External links

 

Gulzar
Gulzar
Gulzar